The Torrent is a 1921 American silent adventure film directed by Stuart Paton and starring Eva Novak, Elita Proctor Otis and Jack Perrin.

Cast
 Eva Novak as Velma Patton
 Elita Proctor Otis as Anne Mayhew 
 Jack Perrin as Lt. Paul Mack
 Lee Shumway as Sam Patton 
 Jack Curtis as Red Galvin
 Harry Carter as Jud Rossen
 Bert Alpino as First Mate

References

Bibliography
 Connelly, Robert B. The Silents: Silent Feature Films, 1910-36, Volume 40, Issue 2. December Press, 1998.
 Munden, Kenneth White. The American Film Institute Catalog of Motion Pictures Produced in the United States, Part 1. University of California Press, 1997.

External links
 

1921 films
1921 adventure films
American silent feature films
American adventure films
Films directed by Stuart Paton
American black-and-white films
Universal Pictures films
1920s English-language films
1920s American films
Silent adventure films